Catherine Henriette de Bourbon (11 November 1596 – 20 June 1663) was an illegitimate daughter of King Henry IV of France and his long-term maîtresse en titre Gabrielle d'Estrées. She was declared legitimate on 17 November 1596 at the Abbey of St. Ouen in Rouen and married into the Princely House of Guise.

Issue
 Charles III of Elbeuf (1620–4 May 1692)
Henri (1622–3 April 1648) never married; Abbot of Hombieres
François Louis, Count of Harcourt (1623–27 June 1694), married and had issue;
François Marie, Prince of Lillebonne (4 April 1624 – 19 January 1694); married and had issue
Catherine (1626–1645)
Marie Marguerite (1629–7 August 1679) known as Mademoiselle d'Elboeuf; died unmarried and childless

References and notes

Sources

1596 births
1663 deaths
16th-century French women
17th-century French women
Catherine Henriette
Illegitimate children of Henry IV of France
Catherine Henriette
Catherine Henriette
French duchesses
People from Rouen
Catherine Henriette
Catherine Henriette